Xiangying Township is a township on the north of Yanqing District, Beijing, China. It borders Houcheng Town to its north, Qianjiadian Town and Liubinbu Township to its east, Yongning and Shenjiaying Towns to its south, and Zhangshanying Town to its west. In 2020, its population was 6.019.

The township was named Xiangying after Xiangying Village that hosts the township's government.

Geography 
Xiangying Township is situated at the foothill of Mount Jinyang, which is a part of the larger Yan Mountain Range. Baihepu Reservoir is at the north of the region.

History

Administrative divisions 
In the year 2021, Xiangying Township consisted of 21 subdivisions, where 1 of them was a community and the rest were villages. They are, by the order of their Administrative Division Codes:

See also 
 List of township-level divisions of Beijing

References

Yanqing District
Township-level divisions of Beijing